Vincetoxicum anomalum is a species of flowering plant in the family Apocynaceae, native to the island of Bioko and Cameroon in the west of Africa, and from Uganda to KwaZulu-Natal and the island of Mayotte in the east of Africa. It was first described by N. E. Brown in 1908 as Tylophora anomala.

Distribution
Vincetoxicum anomalum has a discontinuous distribution. In the west of Africa, it is native to the island of Bioko and to Cameroon. In the west of Africa, it is native to Kenya, KwaZulu-Natal, Malawi, Mozambique, Tanzania, Uganda, Zambia and Zimbabwe, and to the island of Mayotte in the Mozambique Channel.

Conservation
Tylophora urceolata was assessed as "vulnerable" in the 2000 IUCN Red List, where it is said to be native only to Bioko, Cameroon and Tanzania. , T. urceolata was regarded as a synonym of Vincetoxicum anomalum, which has a wider distribution.

References

anomalum
Flora of Cameroon
Flora of the Comoros
Flora of the Gulf of Guinea islands
Flora of Kenya
Flora of KwaZulu-Natal
Flora of Malawi
Flora of Mozambique
Flora of Tanzania
Flora of Uganda
Flora of Zambia
Flora of Zimbabwe
Plants described in 1908